Nevan (meaning "saintly, holy", "little saint", or "follower of the saint") was a saint in Irish folklore whose feast day was reputedly marked in mid-September. His name is rarely used as a given name for boys.

With a different origin, Nevan is also a popular Islamic name found throughout North Africa, Arabia, and the Indian subcontinent.

References

Irish saints
Irish masculine given names